Arunattu Vellalar (also spelt as Arunadu Velalar) is a subcaste of the Vellalar in Tamil Nadu. They are predominantly landlords and agriculturalists.

They are concentrated in Tiruchirappalli district, parts of Namakkal, Salem, Chennai, Coimbatore and Dindigul districts of Tamil Nadu and have spread across Tirupati of Andhra Pradesh, Sri Lanka, Malaysia and Singapore.

They are widely spread into 36 Kothrams, of which only 32 kothrams are live and 4 are extinct.

References 

Vellalar
Social groups of Tamil Nadu